Gülchö is a mountain town in Osh Region of Kyrgyzstan. It is the seat of Alay District. Its population was 13,755 in 2021.

Population

Geography
The M41 highway leading south from Osh to the Alay Valley and eastern Tajikistan passes through Gülchö. The 2402m Chyrchyk Pass separates Gülchö from Osh, and the 3615m Taldyk Pass separates Gülchö from Sary-Tash in the Alay Valley. Gülchö is situated in a broad valley at the confluence of three rivers, forming the river Kurshab.

Climate
Gülchö has a hot, dry-summer continental climate (Köppen climate classification Dsa). The average annual temperature is 8.9 °C (48 °F). The warmest month is July with an average temperature of 22.3 °C (72.1 °F) and the coolest month is January with an average temperature of -7 °C (19 °F). The average annual precipitation is 501mm (19.72"). The wettest month is May with an average of 90mm (3.5") of precipitation and the driest month is September with an average of 16mm of precipitation.

References 

Populated places in Osh Region